Sergei V. Kalinin is a corporate fellow at the Center for Nanophase Materials Sciences (CNMS) at Oak Ridge National Laboratory.  He is also a Joint Associate Professor at the Department of Materials Science and Engineering at the University of Tennessee-Knoxville.

Education 
Kalinin graduated with M.S. from Department of Materials Science, Moscow State University, Russia in 1998. He received his Ph.D. in Materials Science and Engineering from the University of Pennsylvania in 2002 under Prof. Dawn Bonnell.

Career 
He has been a research staff member at ORNL since October 2004 (Senior since 2007, Distinguished since 2013). Previously he was Theme leader for Electronic and Ionic Functionality at CNMS, ORNL (2007– 2015).

He was a recipient of Eugene P. Wigner Fellowship (2002 - 2004).

He became Joint faculty at the Center for Interdisciplinary Research and Graduate Education, University of Tennessee, Knoxville in December 2010. He also became adjunct professor at Sung Kyun Kwan University in January 2013.

Research

Big data in physics and atom by atom fabrication 

Kalinin research focusses on the applications of machine learning and artificial intelligence techniques for the analysis of nanometer scale and atomically resolved imaging data, with the central concept being the extraction of physics of atomic, molecular, and mesoscale interactions from imaging data and enabling the real-time feedbacks for controlled matter modification, patterning, and atom by atom fabrication.

This research emerges at the junction between three concepts. The first is that the development of modern electron and scanning probe microscopies have opened the flood=gates of high-veracity information on structure and functionalities of solids, which is rarely stored or analyzed. Within IFIM, Kalinin has led the development of the operational frameworks including

(a) full information capture from imaging tools such as SPM (RD100 award in 2016) and STEM,

(b) implementation of HPC based crowd-sourced analysis and physics extraction tools, and

(c) implementation of common knowledge spaces (as is common for e.g. scattering, genomics, or mass spectrometry).

Secondly, the complex atomic and mesoscale dynamics are typically underpinned by relatively simple low dimensional mechanisms, whether constitutive relations for mesoscale systems or force-fields in atomistic systems. Consequently, extraction of these simple physical parameters form imaging data can  revolutionize modern science.  He worked on combination of physics-based and data-centric analysis tools for analysis of structural and hyperspectral functional images, including development of the linear and non-linear un-mixing methods that satisfy a priori physical constraints (and hence lead to physically relevant answers), inversion of dynamic imaging data and Bayesian inversion methods for spectral data. Recently, his group starts to delve into application of deep learning networks combined with physical constraints imposed via training sets or via network architecture. The underlying philosophy of this research is to use the known physical constraints and models to establish causative relationships between materials properties and functionalities, and further develop this towards processing, getting beyond the purely correlative paradigm of big data approaches.

Finally, both electron and scanning probe microscopies can affect the materials, most notable example of these effects being electron beam damage in solids. Kalinin and his colleagues  further believe that at this point electron microscopy is positioned to transition from purely imaging tool enabling physics to a new paradigm of atomic matter control and quantum computing, enabled via recently demonstrated atom by atom fabrication by electron beams.

Kalinin has proposed the concept of Atomic Forge, the use of the sub-atomically focused beam of Scanning Transmission Electron Microscopy for atomic manipulation and atom by atom assembly.

Nanoelectromechanics and piezoresponse force microscopy 

Prior to this effort, Kalinin has developed the field of nanoscale electromechanics, exploring the coupling between electrical and mechanical phenomena on the nanoscale. This coupling is extremely common in nature, with piezoelectricity, electrostriction being examples of simple electromechanical behaviors,  whereas hearing and mobility being example of complex ones. In fact, modern physics have arguably started from experiments of Luigi Galvani who detected mechanical response of frog leg to electrical bias. However, electromechanical couplings are remarkably weak even on the nanoscale (e.g. typical piezoelectric responses of inorganic materials are 2-50 pm/V). Furthermore, often of interest are electromechanical responses on the level of individual ferroelectric domains in ceramics, collagen fibrils in bones, etc. The invention of piezoresponse force microscopy by Kolosov and Gruverman has provided the first tool for probing electromechanical phenomena on the nanoscale. Kalinin's contributions to PFM include the first PFM imaging in liquid and vacuum, the first PFM of biological tissues (essentially repeating Galvani's experiment on the nanoscale), the first demonstration and probing of controllable one-dimensional topological defects, and the first observation of nanoscale ferroelectricity in molecular systems. He also pioneered the development of spectroscopic imaging modes that allowed him to visualize polarization switching on the sub-10 nanometer level, solving the 50-year-old Landauer paradox, and discovered the origins of size effect for Rayleigh nonlinearity in thin films.  
	He and his collaborators developed the fundamental theory for contrast formation in PFM and established resolution and contrast transfer mechanisms of domain walls and spectroscopy. In collaboration with Long Qing Chen group, he has pioneered the combination between PFM and phase field modeling, enabling real space deterministic studies of polarization switching on a single defect level. Much of this work was performed in tandem with the development of instrumental methods for ferroelectric characterization. Sergei led the team that pioneered the revolutionary BE principle1 for force-based scanning probe microscopes (SPMs). This transition from single frequency to parallel multifrequency detection enables the quantitative capture of probe-material interactions Building upon this concept, the multidimensional, multimodal spectroscopies developed by Sergei and his team to probe bias and time dynamics in these materials have enabled quantitative studies of polarization dynamics and mechanical effects accompanying switching in ferroelectrics.
	This work has further demonstrated the critical role of electrochemical phenomena on ferroelectric surfaces that led to discovery of new forms of polarization switching. Kalinin's work has revealed the role of the ionic screening on ferroelectric surface, via series of experiments including demonstration of potential retention above Curie temperature, potential inversion, and formation of domain wall shadows during wall dynamics. He has further shown the emergence of chaos and intermittency during domain switching and domain shape symmetry breaking. Most recently, his group has introduced the chemistry-based boundary conditions for phase-field models of ferroelectrics and developed the basic theory and phase-field formulation for domain evolution. He and his collaborators have shown that ferroelectric state is fundamentally inseparable from electrochemical state of the surface, leading to emergence of coupled electrochemical-ferroelectric (ferroionic) states, explored their thermodynamics and thickness evolution of this state, and demonstrate the experimental pathway to establish its presence based on spectroscopic version of piezoresponse force microscopy.

Awards and honors

He is a recipient of:

Presidential Early Career Award for Scientists and Engineers (PECASE) in 2009, 
Blavatnik Award Laureate (2018) and Finalist (2016, 17), 
IEEE-UFFC Ferroelectrics Young Investigator Award in 2010, 
Burton medal of Microscopy Society of America in 2010, 
ISIF Young Investigator Award in 2009, 
American Vacuum Society 2008 Peter Mark Memorial Award, 
2003 Ross Coffin Award and 2009 Robert L. Coble Awards of American Ceramics Society, 
RMS medal for Scanning Probe Microscopy (2015); 
4 R&D100 Awards (2008, 2010, 2016, and 2018)

He was named a fellow of Materials Research Society (2017), Foresight Institute (2017),  MRS (2016), AVS (2015), APS (2015), and a senior member (2015) and Fellow (2017) of IEEE.

He is a member of editorial boards for Nanotechnology, Journal of Applied Physics/Applied Physics Letters, and Nature Partner Journal Computational Materials.

References

External links 
 ORNL's Institute for Functional Imaging of Materials, News Article, March 19, 2015
 Big data, machine learning, and artificial intelligence in Scanning Transmission Electron Microscopy (STEM) and Scanning Probe Microscopy (SPM) Lecture Series (YouTube playlist)
 Piezoresponse Force Microscopy (PFM) and Spectroscopy Lectures Series (YouTube playlist)
 Electronic and Ionic Transport Measurements by Scanning Probe Microscopy (SPM) Lecture Series (YouTube playlist)

Year of birth missing (living people)
Living people
Oak Ridge National Laboratory people
Scientists from Moscow
Moscow State University alumni
University of Pennsylvania alumni
Russian emigrants to the United States
Microscopists
Fellows of the American Physical Society